Daquq, also known as Daqouq, is the central town of Daquq District in Kirkuk Governorate, Iraq. The town has a Kurdish and Turkmen majority, and Arab minority. It is part of the disputed territories of Northern Iraq. The town is a major agricultural area.

Early history 
The name Daquq derives from the Neo-Assyrian word Diquqina. Abul-Fath Mohammad bin Annaz, the founder of the Annazid dynasty, temporarily seized Daquq from Banu Oqayl in 998 AD. Idris Bitlisi mentioned the town in his work Sharafnama from 1597 as a town being a source of naphtha.

Modern history 
Ottoman Midhat Pasha built the famous and intact Daquq bridge in 1883 making it easier for the Ottomans to travel southward. In 1906, the town had about 1,000 people.

In 1925, the town’s population was predominantly Turkmen.

60% of the population was Kurdish in the 1947 census out of a population of 14,600.

It experienced Arabization during the Saddam era in which Kurdish and Turkmen land was seized for Arab settlers. After the fall of the Saddam regime, Kurds forced the Arab settlers out. 

In 2011, an estimated 7.3% of Daquq residents lived below the poverty line.

On 21 October 2016, the International Coalition bombed a Muharram shrine, where 28 Turkmen civilians (25 woman and 3 children) were killed.

Religion 
Many of the Kurds are Kaka'i, while the Turkmen population is Shia. The Kaka'i population reportedly experiences harassment and intimidation from the Popular Mobilization Forces (PMF) which has been controlling the town since 2017. On 21 March 2018, the Kaka'i shrine in the town was destroyed which the local Kaka'is blamed the PMF on.

References

Populated places in Kirkuk Governorate
District capitals of Iraq
Turkmen communities in Iraq

Kurdish settlements in Iraq